Marathos or Marathi  is a small Greek Island in the Aegean sea lying east of Patmos island, southwest of Arkoi island, and northwest of Leipsoi island. It is part of the Dodecanese archipelago. It is a small island with and area of  but there are a couple of tavernas and few rooms to let.

Population 
 1991 - 2
 2011 - 5

References

Islands of the South Aegean
Islands of Greece
Dodecanese
Populated places in Kalymnos (regional unit)